Addakurukki is a village in the Hosur taluk of Krishnagiri district, Tamil Nadu, India. There are 233 households. Nearby industries include the Gangsaw Unity of Madhucon Granites Limited which covers 25 acres of land.

References 

 

Villages in Krishnagiri district